Kill by Inches is a 1999 independent film written and directed by Diane Doniol-Valcroze and Arthur Flam. The film premiered September 12, 1999 at the Toronto International Film Festival in the Discovery section. It opened in New York City on October 26, 2001.

Plot
A deranged young tailor descends into madness and murder.

Cast
 Emmanuel Salinger as Thomas Klamm
 Myriam Cyr as Vera Klamm
 Marcus Powell as The Father
 Chrisopher Zach as The Repairman
 Drummond Erskine as Old Marelewski	
 Peter McRobbie as Ballroom Host	
 Barrett Worland as Competitor #1
 David Fraioli as Competitor #2

Festivals
 Canada: September 12, 1999 Toronto International Film Festival (World premiere)
 Norway: January 19, 2000 Tromso International Film Festival
 Belgium: March 24, 2000 Brussels International Festival of Fantasy Film
 United States: April 15, 2000 Los Angeles Film Festival (USA premiere)
 United States: April 28, 2000 Maryland Film Festival
 United States: June 10, 2000 Florida Film Festival
 Italy:  June 28, 2000 Pesaro Film Festival

Locations
 Conservatory Garden, Central Park, Manhattan, New York City, New York, USA
 Dumbo, Brooklyn, New York City, New York, USA
 Greenpoint, Brooklyn, New York City, New York, USA

Voice over
Creepy poem over opening scene:

In the dead of winter,at the Tailor's Parade,a little boy was givena pair of scissorblades,for his father was a tailor."Go and steal our father's tape measure,"said the sister to her brother,and with the scissorblades,the little boy cut up his father's tape measure...But the old man sawand took his boy by the neckas the sister watched with delight,her brother forced through the nightto keep his mouth wide openand in agony swallowevery last piece of the tape measure,inch by inch, down his throat,till nothing was left.

References

External links
 
 Los Angeles Times review by Kevin Thomas
 New York Times review by Dave Kehr
 New York Observer review "Major Alterations" by Andrew Sarris
 Critical Condition: Obscure & Bizarre Films on Video and DVD review
 Videohound review
 

1999 films
American avant-garde and experimental films
American independent films
French avant-garde and experimental films
French independent films
English-language French films
1990s avant-garde and experimental films
2000s English-language films
1990s English-language films
1990s American films
2000s American films
1990s French films
2000s French films